Millennium Point may refer to:

 Millennium Point, Birmingham, England
 Millennium Point (New York City)

See also
 Millennium Tower (disambiguation)